Suleiman II, also known as Rukn ad-Din Suleiman Shah, was the Seljuk Sultan of Rûm between 1196 and 1204.

Son of Kilij Arslan II, Suleiman overthrew his brother, Sultan Kaykhusraw I, and became sultan in 1196.

Suleiman fought neighbouring rulers and expanded the territories of the Sultanate. In 1201, he conquered Erzurum, giving it as a fief to Mughith al-Din Tugrulshah in 1202. Successful in the wars with the Byzantines, Suleiman was routed by the Georgians in the Battle of Basian of 1203.

Suleiman was succeeded by his son Kilij Arslan III in 1204–1205, after which Kaykhusraw I forced his way into Konya, removed Kilij from power and was enthroned for a second time.

References

Sources

Sultans of Rum
1204 deaths
Year of birth unknown
Seljuk dynasty
13th-century Turkic people